Robert Clifton may refer to:

Sir Robert Clifton, 5th Baronet (1690–1762), MP for East Retford
Sir Robert Clifton, 7th Baronet (1767–1837), High Sheriff of Nottinghamshire in 1820
Robert Cox Clifton (1810–1861), British clergyman and canon of Manchester Cathedral
Robert Bellamy Clifton (1836–1921), British physicist
Robert Juckes Clifton (1826–1869), English Liberal Party politician
Robert D. Clifton (born 1968), American politician
Sumangalo (Robert Stuart Clifton, 1903–1963), American Buddhist monk
PC Robert Clifton, character in the British television series HolbyBlue

See also